The 2016 Orienteering World Cup was the 22nd edition of the Orienteering World Cup. The 2016 Orienteering World Cup consisted of 10 individual events and four sprint relay events. The events were located in Poland, Czech Republic, Sweden and Switzerland. The European Orienteering Championships in Jeseník, Czech Republic and the 2016 World Orienteering Championships in Strömstad, Sweden, were included in the World Cup. 

Matthias Kyburz of Switzerland won his third overall title. Tove Alexandersson of Sweden won her third consecutive overall title in the women's World Cup.

Events

Men

Women

Sprint Relay

Points distribution
The 40 best runners in each event were awarded points. The winner was awarded 100 points. In WC events 1 to 8, the seven best results counted in the overall classification. In the finals (WC 9 and WC 10), both results counted.

Overall standings
This section shows the final standings after all 10 individual events.

Sprint Relay
The table shows the final standings after all four relay events. All results counted in the overall standings.

Achievements
Only individual competitions.

External links
 World Cup Ranking - IOF

References

Orienteering World Cup seasons
Orienteering competitions
2016 in orienteering